Saint Mary's Academy of Capiz, also known by its acronym SMAC or St. Mary's, is a private, Catholic basic education institution run by the Religious of the Virgin Mary in Roxas City, Capiz, Philippines. It was founded in 1947.

Academic offerings

From 1947–2014, the school used the 1945-2011 basic education curriculum which consisted of levels from kindergarten to fourth year high school. Starting in 2012–2013 and onwards, SMAC applied the "Enhanced Basic Education Act of 2013", to which Filipinos refer to as K–12 law. The K–12 basic education program took full effect and shape at the start of academic year 2016-2017 when it opened its senior high school department.

 Preschool - Kindergarten
 Elementary - Grades 1–6
 Junior High School - Grades 7–10

SENIOR HIGH SCHOOL OFFERINGS: (With Government Permit SHS 105, s.o. 2016)

STEM (Science, Technology, Engineering, Mathematics)
ABM (Accountancy, Business and Management)

References

Catholic elementary schools in the Philippines
Catholic secondary schools in the Philippines
Education in Roxas, Capiz
Religious of the Virgin Mary
Educational institutions established in 1947
1947 establishments in the Philippines